"The Paradise of Bachelors and the Tartarus of Maids" is a short story written by American writer Herman Melville. It first appeared in the April 1855 edition of Harper's Magazine. A combination of two sketches, one set in the center of London's legal industry and the other in a New England paper factory, this story can be read as an early comment on globalization.

Plot summary 
In the first sketch, the London bachelors, all lawyers, scholars, or writers, enjoy a sumptuous meal in a cozy apartment near the Temple Bar. In the second sketch, the New England "maids" are young women working in a paper factory.

Composition 
Melville was inspired to write "The Paradise of Bachelors" by a trip to the Inns of Court in December 1849. "The Tartarus of Maids" was inspired by his visit to Carson's Old Red Paper Mill in Dalton, Massachusetts in January, 1851.

References

External links 

 
"The Paradise of Bachelors"
"The Tartarus of Maids"

 
1855 short stories
Short stories by Herman Melville
Works originally published in Harper's Magazine